Dysschema tricolora is a moth of the family Erebidae first described by Sulzer in 1776, and spelled tricolora, though many subsequent authors have misspelled the name as tricolor (e.g. ). It is found in Suriname, Bolivia, Paraguay and Brazil.

Subspecies
Dysschema tricolora tricolora (Suriname, Bolivia, Paraguay)
Dysschema tricolora romani (Bryk, 1953) (Brazil)

References

 

Dysschema
Moths of South America
Moths described in 1776
Taxa named by Johann Heinrich Sulzer